The administrative divisions of Peru have changed from time to time since the nation gained independence from Spain in the early 19th century. The old territorial subdivisions have split or merged due to several reasons, the most common ones being the need for decentralization and population increase, especially in Lima.

History
Peru was divided into 24 departments (departamentos; singular: departamento) until the creation of the regions in 2002. These regions are governed by Regional Governments. Many people still use the old departamentos term when referring to the current regions of Peru, although it is now obsolete. The departments were identical to today's regions, with the exception of two new regions (Callao and Lima). Before the 2002 changeover, the province of Lima (which is basically the city of Lima) was part of the Lima department, and the city of Callao had the special status of Provincia Constitucional (constitutional province). When the regionalization law was passed, the Callao region was created from the former constitutional province, and the province of Lima separated from the rest of the Lima department, which in turn came to form the new Lima Region. A failed attempt to divide the country into twelve autonomous regions had previously been made during the 1980s under the government of Alan García.

Districts
For a new district to be legally established, a 1982 law requires a minimum number of residents to live in the area: 3,500 if it is located in the rainforest, 4,000 in the Andes highlands, and 10,000 in the coastal area.

In the dry Andean area, many districts have fewer than 3,500 inhabitants. In some cases, their populations have decreased in comparison to the days when they were founded. Districts that are located at very high altitudes tend to be scarcely populated. These districts are usually large in area but have little available level land for use. Many basic government services do not reach all residents of these districts due to their difficult geography. Many such districts lack the financial means to govern their whole jurisdictions and often have high emigration rates.

A similar pattern can be observed in many districts located in the Peruvian Amazon rainforest. Once important settlements created during the era of colonization, they now do not offer much space for agriculture. Deeper into the jungle, the districts of the selva baja (lower jungle) have higher populations living in geographically large districts. Districts located outside the former colonized area have very low populations, which are entirely composed of native Amazonian tribes.

All over the country, many districts have higher populations than the minimum required by law. This is true of the colonized areas of the rainforest and the northern Andes, as well as in the southern Andes from Huancayo to the shores of Lake Titicaca, which is the historical heartland of the Peruvian highlands. These districts are old centers of civilization; they tend to be smaller in area, with high population densities since pre-Hispanic times.

Districts in the Chala (coastal area) tend to be mid-sized, except in low-density areas such as the Sechura desert and part of the southern coast. All have gained large populations due to emigration from other regions of the country, which has turned the Peruvian coast into the country's main economic powerhouse.

Districts with a population of more than 10,000 inhabitants should ideally be subdivided, particularly if they are also large in area, as is the case in part of the Amazon rainforest. Settlement can happen quickly and boundaries of districts are often not modified, except in large urban areas. This is less of a problem on the coast, where communication is easier. However, reaching large populations remain a problem in this area.

Current division

Peru's territory, according to the Regionalization Law, which was passed on November 18, 2002, is divided into 26 units: 25 regions (regiones; singular: región) and the Lima Province. The regions are subdivided into provinces (provincias), which are composed of districts (distritos). There are 196 provinces and 1,869 districts in Peru.

The Lima Province, located in the central coast of the country, is unique in that it does not belong to any of the twenty-five regions. (The city of Lima, which is the nation's capital, is located in this province.)

Callao is also its own region, containing only one province, the Constitutional Province of Callao.

References

External links
  Instituto Nacional de Estadística e Informática
 Peru Info: Information by regions

 
Decentralization

no:Peru#Administrativ inndeling